Denis Osadchenko (born 11 May 1990 in Simferopol) is a Ukrainian-German retired footballer.

Career
He began his career by 1.FC Wilmersdorf, who joined in 2001 to Hertha 03 Zehlendorf, later in January 2006 to Tennis Borussia Berlin on youth side. Then has leave on 1 July 2008 to the youth from FC Carl Zeiss Jena and was promoted on 14 January 2009 to the first team, who played his debut on 25 October 2009 against SpVgg Unterhaching.

References

External links
 Player Profile
 FC Carl Zeiss Jena

1990 births
Living people
Sportspeople from Simferopol
German footballers
Ukrainian emigrants to Germany
Naturalized citizens of Germany
FC Carl Zeiss Jena players
Berliner AK 07 players
3. Liga players
Association football defenders